Juan Javier Cabanas López (born 24 April 1960), commonly known as Javier Cabanas is a Spanish former handball player and current coach of Besa Famgas and caretaker of the Kosovo national team. He was a member of the Spain men's national handball team. He was part of the  team at the 1980 Summer Olympics, 1988 Summer Olympics and 1992 Summer Olympics.

References

Living people
Handball players at the 1980 Summer Olympics
Handball players at the 1992 Summer Olympics
1960 births
Spanish male handball players
Handball players at the 1988 Summer Olympics
Olympic handball players of Spain
Sportspeople from Burgos